was a city in Japan until it was absorbed into the newly created city of Kitakyushu in 1963.  Its former area is as of 2007 part of two distinct wards: Yahata Higashi-ku and Yahata Nishi-ku.

References

Kitakyushu
Dissolved municipalities of Fukuoka Prefecture